Brayan Styven López Yepes (born 25 June 1987) is a Colombian footballer. He currently plays as a goalkeeper for Independiente Medellín in the Copa Mustang.

References

External links
 
 

1987 births
Living people
Colombian footballers
Footballers from Medellín
Independiente Medellín footballers
Atlético Bucaramanga footballers
Categoría Primera A players
Association football goalkeepers